Edward Alexander Preble (born in Somerville, Massachusetts on ; died ) was an American naturalist and conservationist. He is noted for work in studying birds and mammals of the Pacific Northwest. He also acted as an editor for nature magazines.

In 1908, Preble published a report on the natural history of the Athabaska-Mackenzie region, or "Boreal America". This monograph was based his two expeditions, in 1901 and again in 1903-4, with the U.S. Biological Survey.

In 1907, Preble and Ernest Thompson Seton discovered the remains of a wolf pack near a long abandoned cabin at the Great Slave Lake in Canada. The two verified the claim of the American frontiersman Charles "Buffalo" Jones, who a full decade earlier in 1897-1898 had traveled to the Arctic Circle in an attempt to capture live musk oxen. Jones had claimed that he and his party shot and fended off the hungry wolves from inside their cabin.

In 1925 Preble became a Consulting Naturalist for Nature Magazine.  When he retired from government service, in 1935, he became one of the journal's Associate Editors - a position he held until his death in 1957.

References

External links
 

American naturalists
American mammalogists
1871 births
1957 deaths